Divuma (or Diongo) is a town in the Lualaba province of the Democratic Republic of the Congo, near the border with Zambia.

Transport

Road
The city is crossed by Transafican Highway 9 (TAH 9), which connects it to the cities of Dilolo and Kasaji.

Rail
The city has a train station, which receives trains from the Benguela railway. It is the junction for a short branchline to the south, which connects with the village of Kisenge.

See also 

 Railway stations in DRCongo

References 

Populated places in Lualaba Province